The Prix du Brigadier, established in 1960 by the  (ART), is an award given to a personality from the world of theater.

The dramatist Jean Anouilh, having rejected all official honors, declared that in his opinion, the only worthwhile reward was the Prix du Brigadier which had been granted to him in 1971. Three other authors have also received this award: Françoise Sagan in 1960; Eugène Ionesco in 1966; and Florian Zeller in 2014.

Laureates 

The Association de la Régie théâtrale maintains an archive of the awards.
 
 1960: Françoise Sagan for Château en Suède, Théâtre de l'Atelier
 1961: Maria Casarès, Pierre Brasseur for Cher Menteur de Jerome Kilty, Théâtre de l'Athénée
 1962: Pierre Dux, Pierre Fresnay for Mon Faust by Paul Valéry, Théâtre de l'Œuvre
 1963: Marcel Marceau for his show, Théâtre de la Renaissance
 1964: Jacques Dupond for the settings of Un mois à la campagne by Ivan Turgenev, Théâtre de l'Atelier
 1966: Eugène Ionesco for La Soif et la faim, Comédie-Française
 1967: Ariane Mnouchkine for La Cuisine, Cirque Medrano
 1968: René Ehni for Que ferez-vous en novembre, Théâtre de Lutèce
 1971: Jean Anouilh for three plays performed during the same period:
 Les Poissons rouges Théâtre de l'Œuvre,
 Ne réveillez pas Madame Comédie des Champs-Élysées,
 Tu étais si gentil quand tu étais petit Théâtre Antoine
 1972: Bernard Haller for Et alors, Théâtre de la Michodière
 1973: Rolf Liebermann for The Marriage of Figaro by Wolfgang Amadeus Mozart, Opéra de Paris
 1975: Peter Brook for Timon of Athens by William Shakespeare, Théâtre des Bouffes du Nord
 1976: Mary Marquet for her poetic recitals, Théâtre des Bouffes-Parisiens and Théâtre Saint-Georges
 1978: Jean Le Poulain for Le Faiseur by Honoré de Balzac, Théâtre des Variétés
 1980: Jeanne Moreau for L'Intoxe by Françoise Dorin, Théâtre des Variétés
 1981: Roman Polanski for Amadeus by Peter Shaffer, Théâtre Marigny
 1982: Raymond Gérôme for his entire career and particularly for his play L'Extravagant Mister Wilde, Théâtre de l'Œuvre
 1984: Jean-Laurent Cochet for his compagny at Théâtre Hébertot
 1985: Serge Lama, Hubert Monloup, Jacques Rosny and Yves Gilbert for Napoléon, Théâtre Marigny
 1986: Laurent Terzieff for Témoignage by Brian Friel, théâtre du Lucernaire and for his entire career.
 1987: Jean-Paul Belmondo for Kean by Jean-Paul Sartre, Théâtre Marigny
 1988: Claude Winter for Death of a salesman by Arthur Miller, Centre national de création d'Orléans and Théâtre de l'Odéon
 1990: Francis Huster for the adaptation, the mise-en-scène and the performing of La Peste by Albert Camus, Théâtre de la Porte-Saint-Martin
 1992:
 Jacques Mauclair for the direction of L'École des femmes by Molière
 Robert Hirsch : Brigadier d'honneur for his entire career.
 1993: Jorge Lavelli for his mise en scène of Macbett by Eugène Ionesco, Théâtre National de la Colline
 1994: Raymond Devos for his spectacle at the Olympia and his entire career.
 2002:
 Fabrice Luchini for his revival of Knock by Jules Romains, Théâtre de l'Athénée
 Suzanne Flon and Georges Vitaly : Brigadiers d'honneur for his entire career.
 2003:
 Michel Aumont for Le Jour du destin by Michel del Castillo, Théâtre Montparnasse
 Christian Damman : Brigadier d'honneur for his entire career.
 2005: François Périer : posthumous brigadier d'honneur for his entire career.
 2008:
 Christian Schiaretti for Coriolanus, TNP Villeurbanne and Théâtre Nanterre-Amandiers
 Claude Rich: Brigadier d’honneur for Le Diable rouge, Théâtre Montparnasse and for his entire career.
 2009:
 Ludmila Mikaël for L'Amante anglaise
 Arnaud Denis for sa mise en scène and his interpretation in Les Femmes savantes
 Étienne Bierry Brigadier d’honneur for his entire career.
 2010: 
 Robin Renucci for Désiré by Sacha Guitry au Théâtre de la Michodière
 Michel Galabru Brigadier d'Honneur for his entire career.
 2011:
 Thierry Hancisse for L'École des Femmes by Molière at the Comédie-Française,
 Judith Magre Brigadier d'Honneur for his entire career.
 2012: 
 Didier Sandre for Collaboration by Ronald Harwood at Théâtre de La Madeleine
 Jean Piat and Roland Bertin Brigadier d'Honneur for their entire careers.
 2013 / 2014:
 Florian Zeller for Le Père at Théâtre Hébertot.
 Michel Bouquet Brigadier d'Honneur for his entire career.
 2015:  
 Michel Fau for his mises-en-scène at Théâtre de l’œuvre and Théâtre Antoine. 
 Jacques Seyres Brigadier d'honneur for his entire career.

Members of the jury 
In 2014 (alphabetical order):
The jury was presided by Danielle Mathieu-Bouillon
  Pascale Bordet, costume designer
 Hans-Peter Cloos, theatre director
 Fanny Cottençon, actress
 Jacques Crépineau, managing director of Théâtre de la Michodière, theater historian 
 Emmanuel Dechartre, actor, managing director of Théâtre 14 Jean-Marie Serreau
 Anne Delbée, actress, theatre director, writer 
 Stéphanie Fagadau-Mercier, managing director of Comédie des Champs-Élysées
 Myriam Feune de Colombie, actress, managing director of Théâtre Montparnasse 
 Frédéric Franck, managing director of Théâtre de l'Œuvre
 Francis Huster, actor, theatre director, author
 Armelle Héliot, journalist, drama critic
 Stéphane Hillel, actor, theatre director, managing director of Théâtre de Paris and of Petit Théâtre de Paris 
 Jean-Claude Houdinière, managing director of Atelier-Théâtre Actuel
 Jorge Lavelli, theatre director 
 Didier Long, theatre director
 Antoine Masure
 Marie-France Mignal, actress, managing director of Théâtre Saint-Georges
 Fabienne Pascaud, journalist, chief editor of Télérama 
 Jean-Marie Rouart, writer, essayist, dramatist, member of the Académie Française 
 Catherine Salviat, comedian, ex-Sociétaire of the Comédie-Française 
 Éric-Emmanuel Schmitt, playwright, writer, philosoph, co-director of Théâtre Rive Gauche 
 Paul Tabet, writer
 Nicolas Vaude, actor, theatre director 
 Jean-Philippe Viaud, journalist for France 2
and Annik Caubert for the Association de la Régie Théâtrale

See also 
Trois coups for the meaning of the word "brigadier" in French.

References

External links 
 Official site  of l'Association de la Régie théâtrale (ART)

Prix du Brigadier